The 2012 WNBA season is the 14th season for the Connecticut Sun franchise of the Women's National Basketball Association. It is their tenth in Connecticut.

Transactions

WNBA Draft
The following are the Sun's selections in the 2012 WNBA Draft.

Transaction log
April 11, 2011: The Sun traded a third-round pick in the 2012 Draft to the Phoenix Mercury as part of the Tahnee Robinson trade.
February 6: The Sun signed Mistie Mims.
February 28: The Sun signed Sidney Spencer and Jessica Breland.
March 16: The Sun signed Dawn Evans.
April 17: The Sun signed Brittany Carter.
April 26: The Sun signed draft pick Chay Shegog.
April 30: The Sun signed Stefanie Murphy.
May 5: The Sun waived Brittany Carter.
May 8: The Sun waived Jessica Breland and Stefanie Murphy.
May 15: The Sun waived Dawn Evans.
May 16: The Sun waived Sidney Spencer.
August 14: The Sun waived Chay Shegog.
August 15: The Sun signed Jessica Moore.

Personnel changes

Additions

Subtractions

Roster

Depth

Season standings

Schedule

Preseason

|- align="center" bgcolor="bbffbb"
| 1 || Mon 7 || 7:00 || New York ||  || 96-81 || GreeneJones (12) || McCray (6) || Lawson (7)|| Mohegan Sun Arena  4,287 || 1-0
|- align="center" bgcolor="ffbbbb"
| 2 || Thu 10 || 7:00 || Minnesota || CPTV-S || 85-87 || Lawson (19)  ||Griffin (9)  || Montgomery (6) || Mohegan Sun Arena  4,835 || 1-1
|- align="center" bgcolor="ffbbbb"
| 3 || Mon 14 || 7:00 || @ Washington ||  || 64-83 || Jones (17) || GriffinShegog (5) || Lawson (4) || Verizon Center  5,142 || 1-2
|-

Regular season

|- align="center" bgcolor="bbffbb"
| 1 || Sat 19 || 4:00 || @ New York || MSG+ || 78-73 || Charles (19) || Charles (13) || Lawson (6) || Madison Square Garden  8,112 || 1-0
|- align="center" bgcolor="bbffbb"
| 2 || Sun 20 || 5:00 || New York || CPTV-S || 92-77 || Charles (25) || Charles (11) || Montgomery (6) || Mohegan Sun Arena  7,118 || 2-0
|- align="center" bgcolor="bbffbb"
| 3 || Fri 25 || 7:00 || San Antonio || CPTV-S || 83-79 || Montgomery (23) || Charles (8) || HightowerJones (5) || Mohegan Sun Arena  6,115 || 3-0
|-

|- align="center" bgcolor="ffbbbb"
| 4 || Fri 1 || 7:00 || Minnesota || CPTV-S || 72-85 || Charles (20) || Charles (12) || Lawson (4) || Mohegan Sun Arena  7,249 || 3-1
|- align="center" bgcolor="bbffbb"
| 5 || Sun 3 || 3:00 || Washington || CPTV-S || 94-86 || Charles (30) || Charles (9) || CharlesGreeneLawson (4) || Mohegan Sun Arena  7,065 || 4-1
|- align="center" bgcolor="bbffbb"
| 6 || Fri 8 || 7:00 || @ Indiana ||  || 89-81 || Lawson (18) || Charles (14) || CharlesMcCrayMontgomery (3) || Bankers Life Fieldhouse  6,041 || 5-1
|- align="center" bgcolor="bbffbb"
| 7 || Sun 10 || 5:00 || Atlanta || CPTV-S || 92-73 || Charles (22) || Charles (11) || Hightower (5) || Mohegan Sun Arena  6,526 || 6-1
|- align="center" bgcolor="ffbbbb"
| 8 || Wed 13 || 8:00 || Los Angeles || ESPN2 || 81-87 || Charles (19) || Charles (13) || Lawson (4) || Mohegan Sun Arena  6,058 || 6-2
|- align="center" bgcolor="bbffbb"
| 9 || Fri 15 || 7:00 || New York ||  || 97-55 || Charles (20) || CharlesJones (8) || Greene (5) || Mohegan Sun Arena  6,522 || 7-2
|- align="center" bgcolor="bbffbb"
| 10 || Sun 17 || 3:00 || @ Atlanta || SSO || 75-73 || Charles (23) || Charles (22) || Lawson (4) || Philips Arena  4,323 || 8-2
|- align="center" bgcolor="bbffbb"
| 11 || Tue 19 || 7:00 || Indiana || CPTV-S || 88-85(OT) || Lawson (22) || CharlesJones (8) || GreeneLawson (3) || Mohegan Sun Arena  6,503 || 9-2
|- align="center" bgcolor="ffbbbb"
| 12 || Thu 21 || 7:00 || @ Indiana || CPTV-SFS-I || 61-95 || Mims (11) || Charles (8) || Lawson (2) || Bankers Life Fieldhouse  6,326 || 9-3
|- align="center" bgcolor="bbffbb"
| 13 || Fri 29 || 7:00 || @ Washington || CPTV-SCSN-MA || 77-64 || Jones (20) || Jones (11) || Hightower (4) || Verizon Center  6,975 || 10-3
|-

|- align="center" bgcolor="ffbbbb"
| 14 || Sun 1 || 5:00 || Seattle || CPTV-S || 83-89(OT) || Lawson (22) || Charles (14) || Hightower (4) || Mohegan Sun Arena  9,201 || 10-4
|- align="center" bgcolor="bbffbb"
| 15 || Fri 6 || 8:00 || @ Tulsa ||  || 86-79 || Charles (24) || CharlesJones (10) || Lawson (6) || BOK Center  4,318 || 11-4
|- align="center" bgcolor="bbffbb"
| 16 || Sat 7 || 8:00 || @ Minnesota || NBATVCPTV-S || 86-80 || Lawson (22) || Charles (15) || Hightower (5) || Target Center  10,882 || 12-4
|- align="center" bgcolor="bbffbb"
| 17 || Tue 10 || 11:30am || @ Washington || CPTV-SCSN-MA || 77-70 || Lawson (17) || Charles (8) || CharlesGreene (4) || Verizon Center  12,569 || 13-4
|- align="center" bgcolor="bbffbb"
| 18 || Wed 11 || 7:00 || Washington ||  || 85-73 || Jones (22) || Jones (9) || Montgomery (6) || Mohegan Sun Arena  7,804 || 14-4
|- align="center" bgcolor="bbffbb"
| 19 || Fri 13 || 8:30 || @ Chicago || CPTV-SCN100 || 80-78(OT) || Charles (25) || Charles (13) || Montgomery (4) || Allstate Arena  5,988 || 15-4
|-
| colspan="11" align="center" valign="middle" | Summer Olympic break
|-

|-
| colspan="11" align="center" valign="middle" | Summer Olympic break
|- align="center" bgcolor="ffbbbb"
| 20 || Thu 16 || 7:00 || @ New York || NBATVMSG || 66-79 || Montgomery (16) || Charles (12) || Lawson (4) || Prudential Center  5,865 || 15-5
|- align="center" bgcolor="bbffbb"
| 21 || Sat 18 || 7:00 || New York || CPTV-S || 85-74 || Charles (23) || Charles (9) || Lawson (5) || Mohegan Sun Arena  8,232 || 16-5
|- align="center" bgcolor="bbffbb"
| 22 || Tue 21 || 7:00 || Tulsa ||  || 82-80(OT) || Lawson (19) || Mims (11) || LawsonMontgomery (4) || Mohegan Sun Arena  6,745 || 17-5
|- align="center" bgcolor="ffbbbb"
| 23 || Sun 26 || 5:00 || Chicago || CPTV-S || 70-82 || Hightower (17) || Charles (8) || Lawson (6) || Mohegan Sun Arena  8,390 || 17-6
|- align="center" bgcolor="bbffbb"
| 24 || Tue 28 || 8:00 || @ Chicago || CPTV-SCN100 || 83-72 || Charles (24) || Charles (14) || Lawson (6) || Allstate Arena  2,884 || 18-6
|- align="center" bgcolor="bbffbb"
| 25 || Thu 30 || 8:00 || @ San Antonio ||  || 84-73 || Charles (20) || CharlesGriffin (10) || Hightower (8) || AT&T Center  5,023 || 19-6
|-

|- align="center" bgcolor="ffbbbb"
| 26 || Sun 2 || 3:00 || @ Atlanta || NBATVSSO || 80-87 || Lawson (16) || Charles (11) || Lawson (5) || Philips Arena  5,020 || 19-7
|- align="center" bgcolor="bbffbb"
| 27 || Tue 4 || 7:00 || @ Washington || CPTV-S || 77-70 || Charles (20) || Charles (13) || MimsLawson (4) || Verizon Center  5,980 || 20-7
|- align="center" bgcolor="ffbbbb"
| 28 || Fri 7 || 7:00 || Phoenix || CPTV-S || 82-91 || Montgomery (25) || Mims (9) || Lawson (4) || Mohegan Sun Arena  8,379 || 20-8
|- align="center" bgcolor="bbffbb"
| 29 || Sun 9 || 5:00 || Chicago || CPTV-S || 82-77 || Charles (24) || CharlesLawson (6) || Lawson (9) || Mohegan Sun Arena  6,658 || 21-8
|- align="center" bgcolor="bbffbb"
| 30 || Wed 12 || 10:00 || @ Phoenix || ESPN2CPTV-S || 100-78 || Lawson (30) || Mims (9) || Lawson (7) || US Airways Center  5,421 || 22-8
|- align="center" bgcolor="ffbbbb"
| 31 || Fri 14 || 11:00 || @ Los Angeles || NBATVCPTV-STWC101 || 82-93 || Charles (21) || Charles (13) || LawsonMontgomery (4) || Staples Center  10,503 || 22-9
|- align="center" bgcolor="bbffbb"
| 32 || Sun 16 || 9:00 || @ Seattle || CPTV-SKONG || 60-58 || Lawson (13) || Mims (11) || 4 players (2) || KeyArena  7,748 || 23-9
|- align="center" bgcolor="bbffbb"
| 33 || Wed 19 || 7:00 || Indiana ||  || 73-67 || Lawson (23) || Charles (12) || Lawson (6) || Mohegan Sun Arena  5,811 || 24-9
|- align="center" bgcolor="bbffbb"
| 34 || Sun 23 || 5:00 || Atlanta || CPTV-S || 92-72 || Lawson (21) || Charles (9) || Montgomery (7) || Mohegan Sun Arena  9,143 || 25-9
|-

| All games are viewable on WNBA LiveAccess or ESPN3.com

Postseason

|- align="center" bgcolor="bbffbb"
| 1 || September 27 || 8:00 || New York || ESPN2 || 65-60 || Charles (17) || Jones (9) || HightowerLawson (5) || Mohegan Sun Arena  5,520 || 1-0
|- align="center" bgcolor="bbffbb"
| 2 || September 29 || 7:00 || @ New York || NBATV || 75-62 || Charles (25) || Charles (14) || Lawson (6) || Prudential Center  7,854 || 2-0
|-

|- align="center" bgcolor="bbffbb"
| 1 || October 5 || 8:00 || Indiana || ESPN2 || 76-64 || Charles (18) || Charles (15) || Montgomery (7) || Mohegan Sun Arena  7,599 || 1-0
|- align="center" bgcolor="ffbbbb"
| 2 || October 8 || 8:00 || @ Indiana || ESPN2 || 76-78 || Lawson (18) || Jones (10) || JonesMontgomery (4) || Bankers Life Fieldhouse  9,225 || 1-1
|- align="center" bgcolor="ffbbbb"
| 3 || October 11 || 8:30 || Indiana || ESPN2 || 71-87 || Charles (18) || Charles (10) || Lawson (4) || Mohegan Sun Arena  6,516 || 1-2
|-

Statistics

Regular season

Awards and honors

References

External links

Connecticut Sun seasons
Connecticut
Connecticut Sun